Yaghmur Ali (also Romanized as Yaghmūr ‘Alī; also known as Yaghmūr A‘lá) is a village in Bash Qaleh Rural District, in the Central District of Urmia County, West Azerbaijan Province, Iran. At the 2006 census, its population was 232, in 72 families.

References 

Populated places in Urmia County